Mionandra is a genus of flowering plants belonging to the family Malpighiaceae.

Its native range is Bolivia to Northern Argentina.

Species:

Mionandra camareoides 
Mionandra paraguariensis

References

Malpighiaceae
Malpighiaceae genera